Petrovskyi District is an urban district of the city of Donetsk, under the control of de facto Donetsk People's Republic, named after a Soviet political figure Grigoriy Petrovsky.

It was created in 1937.

Places

External links
 Petrovsky Raion at the Mayor of Donetsk website
 Petrovsky Raion at the Uzovka website

Urban districts of Donetsk